Pteridium aquilinum (bracken, brake or common bracken), also known as eagle fern, is a species of fern occurring in temperate and subtropical regions in both hemispheres. Originally native to Eurasia and North America, the extreme lightness of its spores has led to it achieving a cosmopolitan distribution.

Etymology
Common bracken was first described as Pteris aquilina by Carl Linnaeus, in Volume 2 of his Species Plantarum in 1753. The origin of the specific epithet derived from the Latin aquila "eagle". In the reprint of the Flora Suecica in 1755, Linnaeus explains that the name refers to the image of an eagle seen in the transverse section of the root. In spite of this, the opinion has been forwarded that the name pertains to the shape of the mature fronds appearing akin to an eagle's wing. However, medieval scholars, including Erasmus, thought the pattern of the fibres seen in a transverse section of the stipe resembled a double-headed eagle or oak tree.

Taxonomy
It was traditionally treated as the sole species in the genus Pteridium (brackens); authorities have split and recognised up to 11 species in the genus, however. It was placed in the genus Pteridium by Friedrich Adalbert Maximilian Kuhn in 1879. Genetic analysis of Pteridium from 100 different locations worldwide has revealed two distinct species and despite the common name "bracken" being shared, the "southern" species is Pteridium esculentum. Though the southern P. esculentum shows little genetic diversity among physically isolated locations, P. aquilinum has distinct groups at the continental scale. However, evidence of long-distance gene flow was found in samples taken from Hawaii that presented elements of both North American and Asian subspecies of P. aquilinum.

Description
Common bracken is a herbaceous perennial plant, deciduous in winter. The large, roughly triangular fronds are produced singly, arising upwards from an underground rhizome, and grow to 0.3–1 m (1–3 ft) tall; the main stem, or stipe, is up to 1 cm (0.4 in) diameter at the base. It dies back to ground level in autumn.The rhizome grows up to 3.5 m (11.5 ft) deep, about 5cm (2 in) in diameter, and up to 15m (49 ft) long. Because it regrows in the spring from an underground rhizome, P. aquilinum tends to be found in dense colonies on genetically identical fronds. In the spring as the plant enters its growing cycle, fiddleheads are first sent up from the rhizome. The density and area covered by a single rhizome maximizes that rhizome’s chance of biological success when sending up new growth. The new growth presents as vertical stalks, coiled and covered in silver-gray hairs, that can be several feet in height before unfurling into fronds.

Reproduction
Sporangia are formed in sori on the underside of the frond. They are arranged in narrow brown bands, and form spores over July, August and September.

Habitat
Bracken grows in pastures, deciduous and coniferous woodlands, and hillsides. It prefers acidic soils.

An adaptable plant, bracken readily colonises disturbed areas. It can even be aggressive in countries where it is native, such as England, where it has invaded heather (Calluna vulgaris (L.) Hull) stands on the North Yorkshire moors. In Ireland, bracken is found in open woodland and sandy pastures.

Distribution
Bracken is native to Europe, Eastern Asia and North America, but now has an almost cosmopolitan distribution. In the Americas, it is found throughout the continental United States and the Canadian provinces of Ontario, Quebec, and Newfoundland. Its range's northern border extends to southern Alaska, while its southern reaches the northern portions of Mexico, as well as the Greater Antilles in the Caribbean. Weedy in acidic upland pastures of northwestern Europe.

Uses

Food 

Despite its established toxicity, P. aquilinum’s global distribution — it is the fifth most widely distributed common weed species in the world — means that it has a long history of being consumed in many parts of the world. The toxicity and wide distribution has led to variation in cultural attitudes towards the consumption of the plant. In the United Kingdom where P. aquilinum is extremely successful, the rhizome was once consumed during and after World War I. However the Royal Horticultural Society now explicitly advises against its consumption due to toxicity.

Bracken is a widely eaten vegetable in Korea, Japan, Russian Far East, and parts of China where they have historically been some of the most important wild vegetables consumed. Populations of these countries where bracken is traditionally consumed have been able to access bracken in new locations after immigrating due to P. aquilinum’s global ubiquity. 

In Korea, bracken is known as gosari. It is soaked, parboiled, and stir-fried, and often eaten as a side dish (namul). It is also a classic ingredient of bibimbap.

In Japan, bracken is known as warabi (蕨, ワラビ), and a jelly-like starch made from it is a key ingredient for the chilled dessert warabimochi.  As a type of sansai (mountain vegetables), young bracken shoots are steamed, boiled, or cooked in soups. The shoots are also preserved in salt, sake, or miso.

Bracken shoots have been used to produce beer in Siberia, and among indigenous peoples of North America.

The rhizome can be ground into flour to make bread. In the Canary Islands, the rhizome was historically used to make a porridge called gofio.

Bracken leaves are used in the Mediterranean region to filter sheep's milk, and to store freshly made ricotta cheese.

Pharmacology 
P. aquilinum has been investigated for its anti-inflammatory and antioxidative properties.

Toxicity 
The plant contains the carcinogenic compound ptaquiloside.  Ptaquiloside is known to cause hemorrhagic diseases in ruminants, tumors and hematological problems in non-ruminants, and is correlated with esophageal and gastric cancer in humans. High stomach cancer rates are found in Japan and North Wales, where the young stems are used as a vegetable, but it is unknown whether bracken plays any part or if the cancer can be attributed to another cause. Consumption of ptaquiloside-contaminated milk is thought to contribute to human gastric cancer in the Andean states of Venezuela. The spores have also been implicated as carcinogens. Consumption of contaminated water and meat may be dangerous as well. 

However, ptaquiloside is water-soluble, and is reduced by soaking bracken in cool water. Korean and Japanese cooks have traditionally soaked the shoots in water and ash to detoxify the plant before eating. At boiling temperature, the carcinogen denatures almost completely. Salt and baking soda also help with volatilizing the chemical.

It has been suggested that selenium supplementation can prevent as well as reverse the immunotoxic effects induced by ptaquiloside from Pteridium aquilinum.

References

External links

Flora Europaea: Pteridium aquilinum
Flora of North America: Pteridium aquilinum

Dennstaedtiaceae
Flora of North America
Korean vegetables
Ferns of Asia
Ferns of Europe
Japanese vegetables
Flora of Malta